Anders Holm (21 December 1878 – 29 June 1959) was a Danish writer. His work was part of the literature event in the art competition at the 1932 Summer Olympics.

References

1878 births
1959 deaths
20th-century Danish male writers
Olympic competitors in art competitions
People from Copenhagen